Vladimir Cazacliu (born 1887, Cuşelăuca - died 1950, Bucharest) student, was a Bessarabian politician, member of the Sfatului Țării.

Biography 
He served as Member of the Moldovan Parliament (1917–1918). On 27 March 1918, Vladimir Cazacliu (as Ion and Grigore) voted the Union of Bessarabia with Romania. The Cazacliu family played an important role in the Great Union; Ion Cazacliu was Vladimir's uncle, and Grigore Cazacliu was his brother.

Gallery

Bibliography 
Gheorghe E. Cojocaru, Sfatul Țării: itinerar, Civitas, Chişinău, 1998, 
Mihai Taşcă, Sfatul Țării şi actualele autorităţi locale, "Timpul de dimineaţă", no. 114 (849), June 27, 2008 (page 16)

External links 
 Arhiva pentru Sfatul Tarii
 Deputaţii Sfatului Ţării şi Lavrenti Beria

Notes

1890s births
1950 deaths
People from Șoldănești District
People from Soroksky Uyezd
Moldovan MPs 1917–1918
Romanian people of Moldovan descent